Fabiano Josué de Souza Silva (born 14 March 2000), better known as just Fabiano, is a Brazilian professional footballer who plays as a right-back for Turkish club Kasımpaşa on loan from the Portuguese club Braga.

Professional career
Fabiano is a youth product of the Brazilian clubs Penapolense and Linense, before moving to the youth academy of Braga in Portugal in 2018. He made his professional debut with Braga in a 4–0 Primeira Liga win over Aves on 4 July 2020. He spent the 2020–21 season on loan with Académica.

On 1 February 2023, Fabiano moved on loan to Kasımpaşa in Turkey, with an option to buy.

References

External links
 
 

2000 births
People from Presidente Prudente, São Paulo
Footballers from São Paulo (state)
Living people
Brazilian footballers
Association football fullbacks
S.C. Braga players
Associação Académica de Coimbra – O.A.F. players
Kasımpaşa S.K. footballers
Primeira Liga players
Liga Portugal 2 players
Campeonato de Portugal (league) players
Süper Lig players
Brazilian expatriate footballers
Brazilian expatriate sportspeople in Portugal
Expatriate footballers in Portugal
Brazilian expatriate sportspeople in Turkey
Expatriate footballers in Turkey